The Croatian Encyclopedia is a Croatian national encyclopedia published by the Miroslav Krleža Institute of Lexicography.

Overview 

The project began in 1999, and it represents a fifth iteration of the encyclopedic tradition that was established by Mate Ujević's Croatian Encyclopedia, and continued in the Encyclopedia of the Lexicographical Institute, as well as the two editions of the General Encyclopedia.

Eleven volumes were published in the period 1999-2009, with a new volume appearing every year. Since 2010, the Internet edition of the encyclopedia was prepared, updated and enriched with new multimedia content. The free Internet edition of the Croatian Encyclopedia has been available since September 2013. Paper volumes are no longer published and further work has been exclusively done in the form of a computer database, which serves as the basis for Internet and other multimedia editions of the encyclopedia.

Volumes

Printed volumes total 9272 pages and 67,077 articles, with a total of 1,059,000 lines of text. It represents a combined effort of 1070 authors, mainly associates. Individual volumes are a result of collaboration of 20 to 30 workers of the Lexicographic Institute, and 300-400 associate contributors.

References

External links
 Croatian Encyclopedia - Online Edition 

National encyclopedias
Croatian online encyclopedias
Internet properties established in 2013
20th-century encyclopedias
21st-century encyclopedias